Patrick Hanssens (born 6 June 1956) is a Belgian sprint canoer who competed in the mid-1980s. At the 1984 Summer Olympics in Los Angeles, he finished ninth in the K-2 1000 m event while being eliminated in the semifinals of the K-2 500 m event.

References
Sports-Reference.com profile

1956 births
Belgian male canoeists
Canoeists at the 1984 Summer Olympics
Living people
Olympic canoeists of Belgium
20th-century Belgian people